Hari Prasad Sharma (1940–Living) was a Nepalese judge who served as 16th Chief Justice of Nepal, in office from 14 January 2005 to 29 July 2005. He was appointed by the then-king of Nepal, Gyanendra.

Sharma was preceded by Govinda Bahadur Shrestha and succeeded by Dilip Kumar Poudel.

References 

Chief justices of Nepal
1940 births
Living people